Lukas Boeder (born 18 April 1997) is a German professional footballer who plays as a defender for  side 1. FC Saarbrücken.

Career
In 2017, after having been on loan previously, Boeder joined SC Paderborn on a permanent transfer signing a two year contract until 2019. For the 2019–20 season, he joined MSV Duisburg. He left Duisburg at the end of the season. He joined Hallescher FC on a one-year contract on 26 August 2020.

Career statistics

References

External links

Living people
1997 births
Footballers from Essen
German footballers
Germany youth international footballers
Association football defenders
2. Bundesliga players
3. Liga players
Bayer 04 Leverkusen players
SC Paderborn 07 players
MSV Duisburg players
Hallescher FC players
1. FC Saarbrücken players